Sotnikovo is a rural locality (a village) in Yudinskoye Rural Settlement, Velikoustyugsky District, Vologda Oblast, Russia. The population was 60 as of 2002. There are 3 streets.

Geography 
Sotnikovo is located 6 km northeast of Veliky Ustyug (the district's administrative centre) by road. Korobeynikovo is the nearest rural locality.

References 

Rural localities in Velikoustyugsky District